The coccygeal glomus (coccygeal gland or body; Luschka’s gland) is a vestigial structure placed in front of, or immediately below, the tip of the coccyx.

Anatomy
It is about 2.5 mm. in diameter and is irregularly oval in shape; several smaller nodules are found around or near the main mass.

It consists of irregular masses of round or polyhedral cells epitheloid cells, which are grouped around a  dilated sinusoidal capillary vessel.

Each cell contains a large round or oval nucleus, the protoplasm surrounding which is clear, and is not stained by chromic salts. Since it is not stained by chromic salts, it is not truly a part of Chromafin system; viz. the system which includes cells stained by chromic salts, consisting of renal medulla, para ganglia, and para aortic bodies.

It is situated near the ganglion impar in pelvis, and also at the termination of median sacral artery.

Clinical significance
It may appear similar to a glomus tumor.

References

Human anatomy